Government Islamia High School Jaranwala is famous High school of Jaranwala for boys from 6th Grade to 10th Gradeis established in 1953.
Boys of nearby villages and Jaranwala city studied here.
It was established as private school and in 1972 it was nationalized by Government of Pakistan.it is located near Jaranwala–Nankana Road many students from Chak 236 GB Kilanwala  study here. According to some sources Famous Entrepreneur and Social Activist Muhammad Taqui also completed his Matriculation from here.

See also
Government Degree College Jaranwala
Chak 236 GB Kilanwala

References

 01
Boys' schools in Pakistan
1953 establishments in Pakistan
Educational institutions established in 1953